The Mercedes-Benz C-Class (W203) is the internal designation for a range of compact executive cars manufactured and marketed by DaimlerChrysler from 2000 to early 2007, as the second generation of the C-Class — in sedan/saloon, three-door liftback (marketed as the SportCoupé and sub-designated CL203) and station wagon/estate (sub-designated S-203) body styles.

Design and development 

Design work on the W203 C-Class began in mid-1994, with the final design being approved in December 1995 by the executive board. Design patents were filed on 20 April 1998 and 4 March 1999. Testing began in 1997, with development concluding in 2000. The second generation C-Class was unveiled on March 21, 2000, going on sale starting in September 2000. The sedan debuted with a range of inline-four and V6 petrol engines and inline-four and -five diesels. Most of the engines were carried over from the W202, but the C 320 was exclusive, offering . The diesels now featured common rail direct fuel injection and variable geometry turbochargers. Six-speed manual gearboxes were now standard for the entire range, except the C 320. There was a version of this car that was made in Korea.

Mercedes-Benz debuted a coupe variant in October 2000 (launching in 2001), labelled the C-Class SportCoupé and given the internal designation CL203 (see below). The third body variant, a station wagon codenamed S203 arrived in 2001. Then in 2002 for the 2003 model year, a new family of supercharged four cylinder engines, dubbed M271, debuted for the entire C-Class range. All of them used the same 1.8-litre engine, with different designations according to horsepower levels, including a version powered by natural gas. The C 230 Kompressor variant sported . For the C 240 and C 320, 4MATIC four-wheel drive versions were also offered in addition to rear-wheel drive.

Along with the C-Class Estate (wagon), the SportCoupé was discontinued in Canada and the United States after the 2005 model year. The SportCoupé continued on sale in other markets until 2008. From October 2000 until 2007, a total of 230,000 SportCoupé were built in the Bremen factory and in Brazil.

As of 20 Sep 2006, over two million C-Class vehicles (including sedan, station wagon and SportCoupé) had been sold since March 2000, with 1.4 million sedans since May 2000, 330,000 wagons since spring 2001, and 283,000 of SportCoupé since spring 2001. Over 30 percent of total sales occurred in Germany, and over 20 percent in the United States. The last W203 C-Class sedan was produced on 14 December 2006 at the Sindelfingen plant, although US-market sedans were made as late as March 2007.

Facelift

The C-Class W203 was refreshed in early 2004. In North America, the refresh took effect for the 2005 model year. The interior styling was changed in all three body styles. The instrument cluster was revised to display four chrome gauges with multifunction display in the middle. Center console revision with new radio and climate control designs were also included. A fully integrated iPod connection kit was available as was a better Bluetooth phone system made optional. For the North American market C230, the "sport" package was made standard which included AMG edition bumpers, side skirts, and a rear spoiler. The exterior had changes of different wheel designs, grills and clear lens headlights. New more aggressive front, rear bumpers and side skirting were also installed.

Several all-new M272 and OM642 V6 engines were introduced later in the year. In North America, the changes took effect for the 2006 model year. The C230, C280, C350 replaced the C240 and C320, the new-generation six-cylinder engines developed substantially more power than the older versions, by as much as 24 percent, whilst also increasing fuel economy and reducing  emissions. The C230, C280 and C350 developed ,  and  respectively. The three-valve twin spark design was replaced by a four-valve design, now with variable valve timing. On the diesel side, Mercedes-Benz released a brand-new 3.0-litre V6. Fitted to the 320 CDI, the new diesel cut  emissions and fuel consumption over the old C270 CDI. In addition, these engines also received the new seven-speed 7G-Tronic automatic transmission.

Engines 

*Electronically limited

***Performance may vary in vehicles designated as "flexible fuel" or flex-fuel. Based on premium fuel. Performance may vary with fuel octane rating as specified in Operator's Manual.

1 Please see 2007 Operator's Manual C-Class

2Please see 2005 Operator's Manual C-Class

3Please see 2004 Operator's Manual C-Class

4Please see 2003 Operator's Manual C-Class

Flexible Fuel ("Flex-Fuel") models  (2003–2007)

C 320 (2003-2005) 
Mercedes-Benz began offering their flexible fuel (flex-fuel) option in the C 320 Sedan, C 320 Sport Sedan, C 320 wagon, and C320 Sport Coupe from 2003 until 2005.

C 240 (2005) 
Mercedes-Benz offered the flexible fuel (flex-fuel) option in the C 240 Sedan and Wagon in 2005 only.

C 230 (2007) 
Mercedes-Benz later offered the flexible fuel (flex-fuel) option to the 2007 C 230 Sport Sedan.

AMG models  (2001–2007)

C 32 (2001–2003) 

After the performance of the AMG models in the previous generation, Mercedes-Benz attempted to increase sales among high-end buyers by introducing two different AMG versions of the new model in 2001. Like its predecessors, it used a five-speed automatic, helping it to complete a  sprint in 5.2 seconds. The C 32 was mainly sold as a sedan, although a limited run of C 32 station wagons were made for some markets. The C 32 AMG Sportcoupe was only offered in 2003 by request as an AMG STUDIO order with the production numbers unknown.

C 30 CDI (2002–2004) 

Like the C 32, it was available in all three body styles, but this diesel model did not reach sales expectations and was retired in 2004. The car's exterior resembled that of the C 32 AMG.

C 55 (2004–2007) 

Along with the mid-generation refresh of the C-Class in 2005, the C 32 AMG was also replaced, giving way to a new 5.4-litre naturally aspirated V8-powered C 55 AMG. The C 55 AMG uses a V8 from the same engine family as the W202 generation C 43 AMG. Unlike the less-powerful V6s in the rest of the Mercedes-Benz lineup, the C 55 AMG continued to use the five-speed automatic with AMG Speedshift. The C 55 shares its longer front end design with the CLK 55 AMG to accommodate the larger 5.4-litre engine. The C 55 AMG is one of two AMG models to feature different structure than its base Mercedes platform, the other being the W204 C 63 with its custom elongated engine bay. The C 55 was the first AMG C-Class to feature quad exhaust outlets and an external differential cooler. The Nürburgring Nordschleife lap time seen on List of Nürburgring Nordschleife lap times for the C 55 AMG is 8:22 compared to 8:37 for the C 32 AMG mainly due to the revised suspension and extra torque. The C 55 was mainly sold as a sedan with a portion of wagons being sold in European markets.

Coupe

2000–2008: SportCoupé (CL203) 

Mercedes introduced the C-Class Sport-Coupé (codenamed "Peanut" ver. CL203) to Europe in October 2000 as a three-door hatchback coupe with a fastback profile, based on the regular W203 C-Class range. North American sales began in 2001 for the 2002 model year.

Whereas the C-Class sedan and wagon had the traditional Mercedes horizontal bar grille with the hood ornament, the coupé had a star-grille front end giving it a sportier look. The coupé also had a fastback roofline, an optional panoramic sunroof, and a functional rear spoiler to provide downforce at high speeds. The coupé was seven inches (178 mm) shorter overall than the sedan, while sharing the same wheelbase length.

Initial engines included the C 180 (139 PS), C 220 (143 PS), C 200 Kompressor, and C 230 Kompressor. In 2003 the M111 was replaced with a quieter and more efficient DOHC supercharged 1.8 liter four-cylinder engine (M271).

The C 230 Sport Coupe and the C 320 Sport Coupe were the two most inexpensive models in the Mercedes-Benz lineup of the United States and Canada at the time, although the resultant "inexpensive Mercedes" moniker was seen as undermining the marque which was traditionally composed of expensive cars. The C 230 base trim enabled the automaker to reach a lower price point than existing models sold in North America, although it lacked standard leather seats and a CD player which were amenities typically expected of German luxury imports, and adding those options made the car similarly as expensive as the BMW 325Ci Coupe and Audi TT both of which had better handling. The SportCoupé's liftback profile was seen as sleeker and more graceful while providing ample storage space, compared to its closest competitor in the BMW 3 Series Compact which was derisively regarded as a truncated regular 3 Series Coupé. Although the hatchback body style was declining in popularity among North American customers during the late 1990s, resulting in the first generation 3 Series Compact being pulled from that market in 1999 after a short sales run, Mercedes offered the SportCoupé for the 2002 model year onward alongside other W203 C-Class models. Mercedes found that the C-Class SportCoupé was a popular first Mercedes for new customers, 40% of whom reportedly return to subsequently buy more expensive models.

2008–2011: CLC-Class (CL203) 

The SportCoupé was spun off into its own separate line called the CLC-Class in 2008. The car was presented at the 2008 Mercedes-Benz Fashion Week Berlin, which took place from 27 to 31 January. The CLC was produced in Brazil at the company's plant in Juiz de Fora, close to the state border with Rio de Janeiro.

Although the CLC is still based on the W203 platform, it was refreshed with an updated front and tail inspired by the W204 series C-Class. The refresh reworked the rear and front along with some other refinements and new details (Mercedes claimed around 1,100 components), including a steering system borrowed from the SLK-Class and a revised suspension. Out of the sheetmetal of the CLC-Class, only the doors, roof and quarter panels were carried over from the C-Class Sportcoupé. The interior is still largely similar to the first-generation SportCoupé, although it did receive the Steering wheel from the facelifted W219 and an updated optional navigation system.

Some auto journalists noted that the improvements were limited in order to differentiate the CLC-Class and protect the status of the more lucrative marques in the lineup; one reviewer stated the "CLC does just about enough to introduce new customers to the world of Mercedes" and that it had the "feel of an authentic Mercedes-Benz, which is more than I’d say about the A-Class and B-Class front-wheel-drive hatchbacks". Due to the age of the W203 platform which "exudes a level of float and wallow" not found in the W204 C-Class, the CLC received mixed reviews against sportier rivals such as the BMW 1 Series coupé (a successful replacement of the 3 Series hatchback).

In 2009 the CLC 160 BlueEFFICIENCY was added to the range, and the CLC 230 was rechristened as the CLC 250.

Daimler AG decided that the CLC would not continue production. Instead, the W204 C-Class received a traditionally designed coupé added to the lineup for the 2012 model year, coinciding with the facelifted W204 sedan/saloon in the fourth quarter of 2011. The 2012 C-Class Coupe is positioned directly against the BMW 3 Series Coupé (later 4 Series). The A-Class would be redesigned to match up against the BMW 1 Series.

CLC-series engines

References 

W203
W203
Cars introduced in 2000
Cars discontinued in 2011
2010s cars
Compact executive cars
Police vehicles